Charles P. Kindregan Jr. (June 18, 1935 – April 19, 2016) was a professor of law at Suffolk University Law School in Boston, with a speciality in assisted reproduction law.

Kindregan received a BA and MA from La Salle University, a Juris Doctor from Chicago–Kent College of Law of the Illinois Institute of Technology and an LL.M from Northwestern University Law School. Kindregan taught at Virginia Military Institute from 1961 to 1962 and then became an assistant professor at Loyola Law School from 1963 to 1967. In 1967 he was appointed an assistant professor at Suffolk University Law School, serving in this position from 1967 to 1969.  He became an associate professor in 1968 and a full professor in 1972.  Kindregan continued to teach at Suffolk and served as director of advanced legal studies from 1980 to 1988 and associate dean from 1990 to 1994. He was appointed distinguished professor for research and scholarship in 2005.

Kindregan authored or co-authored texts on family law and torts, including the American Bar Association book on assisted reproduction. He also led the ABA committee to form the model rules in this area.

References and external links

Illinois Institute of Technology alumni
La Salle University alumni
Northwestern University Pritzker School of Law alumni
Lawyers from Boston
Suffolk University Law School faculty
Chicago-Kent College of Law alumni
1935 births
2016 deaths
20th-century American lawyers